Translate is the third studio album by English electronica artist Luke Abbott. It was released on 20 November 2020, via record label Border Community.

Track listing

References

2020 albums